The Europe Zone was the unique zone within Group 4 of the regional Davis Cup competition in 2021. The zone's competition was held in round robin format in Skopje, North Macedonia, from 22 to 26 June 2021.

Participating nations

Draw
Date: 22–26 June 2021

Location: Tennis Club Jug, Skopje, North Macedonia (clay)

Format: Round-robin basis. One pool of five teams and one pool of four teams. The top two in each pool will be promoted to Europe Group III in 2022.

Seeding

 1Davis Cup Rankings as of 8 March 2021

Round Robin

Pool A

Pool B

Standings are determined by: 1. number of wins; 2. number of matches; 3. in two-team ties, head-to-head records; 4. in three-team ties, (a) percentage of sets won (head-to-head records if two teams remain tied), then (b) percentage of games won (head-to-head records if two teams remain tied), then (c) Davis Cup rankings.

Round Robin

Pool A

Montenegro vs. Albania

Armenia vs. Albania

Montenegro vs. Azerbaijan

Armenia vs. Azerbaijan

Montenegro vs. Armenia

Albania vs. Azerbaijan

Pool B

North Macedonia vs. Kosovo

Andorra vs. Moldova

North Macedonia vs. Andorra

San Marino vs. Kosovo

North Macedonia vs. San Marino

Kosovo vs. Moldova

San Marino vs. Moldova

Kosovo vs. Andorra

North Macedonia vs. Moldova

San Marino vs. Andorra

References

External links
Official Website

Davis Cup Europe/Africa Zone
Europe Zone